Victor Valentin Dreyer (15 February 1866 – 7 May 1944), known in religious life as Colomban Dreyer, was a French prelate of the Catholic Church who worked as a missionary bishop in North Africa and in the diplomatic service of the Holy See as the Apostolic Delegate to Indochina.

Biography
Victor Valentin Dreyer was born in Rosheim, France, on 15 February 1866. He attended the seminary in Saint-Dié-des-Vosges and then joined the Order of Friars Minor, taking the name Marie Colomban. He was ordained a priest on 25 July 1889.

He held several posts within his order, including assignments in Canada, Rome, and the Holy Land.

On 27 June 1923, Pope Pius XI named him a titular bishop and the first Apostolic Vicar of the Rabat, Morocco. He received his episcopal consecration from Cardinal Louis-Ernest Dubois, Archbishop of Paris, on 16 August 1923.

On 11 March 1927, Pope Pius named him the first Apostolic Vicar of Suez Canal.

On 24 November 1928, Pope Pius named him Apostolic Delegate to Indochina and on 26 November a titular archbishop. He retired in 1936 upon the appointment of his successor in that position. 

Dreyer died on 7 May 1944 in Vigny, Val-d'Oise.

References

External links
Catholic Hierarchy: Archbishop Victor Colomban Dreyer, O.F.M. 

1866 births
1944 deaths
Diplomats of the Holy See
People from Rosheim
French Roman Catholic missionaries
Roman Catholic bishops of Rabat